The following lists events that happened during 2007 in Colombia.

Incumbents
 President: Álvaro Uribe Vélez 
 Vice President: Francisco Santos Calderón

Events

January
 January 15 - Colombian police arrest Eugenio Montoya, also known as Don Hugo, suspected of being a leader of the Norte del Valle syndicate, which is described by the Federal Bureau of Investigation as the "most powerful and violent drug-trafficking organization in Colombia".

February
 February 15 - Six Colombian legislators are arrested due to alleged links to paramilitary groups including Senator Álvaro Araújo, the brother of Foreign Minister María Consuelo Araújo.
 February 19 - Colombian foreign minister María Consuelo Araújo resigns days after the arrest of her brother, Senator Álvaro Araújo, in the country's ongoing para-political scandal. President Álvaro Uribe Vélez appoints Fernando Araújo as the new Minister.

March
 March 23 - Jorge Noguera, former Colombian intelligence chief, is freed from prison following a ruling by an appeals court after having been jailed last month for collaborating with right wing militia.

April
 April 26 - A nationwide mid-morning power outage hits Colombia; government sources discount guerrilla activity and blame a technical fault.

May
 May 9 - At least nine Colombian policeman are killed and six others injured from a bomb planted by the Revolutionary Armed Forces of Colombia in Santander Department.
 May 14 - Jorge Daniel Castro, the head of the Colombian National Police force and Guillermo Chavez, the intelligence chief, resign over an illegal wiretapping scandal.

July
 July 10 - Simón Trinidad, a high-ranking member of the Revolutionary Armed Forces of Colombia, is found guilty of conspiracy to hold three Americans hostage by a U.S. court.
 July 28 - Colombia's intelligence chief Andrés Peñate claims FARC rebels accidentally killed 11 politicians it was holding, after running into another rebel unit.
 July 30 - Juan Manuel Santos, the Defense Minister of Colombia, claims that the military has been infiltrated by FARC and drug gangs.

August
 August 7 - Juan Carlos Ramirez-Abadia, Colombian cocaine trafficker boss of the Norte del Valle Cartel is apprehended in Brazil and faces extradition to the United States. The US Government had offered a reward of US$5 million.

September
 September 10 - Diego León Montoya Sánchez, leader of the Norte del Valle cartel and one of the FBI Ten Most Wanted Fugitives, is captured by Colombian authorities.

October
 October 13 - At least 20 people die following a landslide at an open pit gold mine near Suarez in the Tolima department.

References

 
2000s in Colombia
Years of the 21st century in Colombia
Colombia
Colombia